Marc Eversley (born 1969) is the general manager of the Chicago Bulls of the National Basketball Association.

Eversley's family moved from London to Toronto when he was four years old. After university, Eversley worked at Nike in their retail and marketing departments. Following the clothing company, Eversley worked for the Toronto Raptors under Bryan Colangelo. When Colangelo was let go, he moved to Washington. He rejoined Colangelo's staff in Philadelphia, and stayed with that team past Colangelo's firing.

He is the first Canadian-trained basketball player to become an NBA general manager, the first NBA general manager from the Greater Toronto Area, and the first person of color to serve as the general manager of the Chicago Bulls franchise.

References

Living people
Chicago Bulls executives
People from Brampton
1969 births